Tsanteleina (3,601m) is a mountain of the Graian Alps located on the border between Savoie, France and Aosta Valley, Italy. It lies at the head of the Val di Rhèmes, although the summit itself is hidden from view in the valley. The eastern side of the mountain lies within the Gran Paradiso National Park.

The normal route to the summit is from the north as the paths on the other side of the mountain have been neglected due to the poor quality of the rock. The north face is also popular with ski mountaineers.

References

External links
 https://tsanteleina.com

Mountains of the Alps
Alpine three-thousanders
Mountains of Aosta Valley
Mountains of Savoie
France–Italy border
International mountains of Europe
Mountains partially in France